Softball New Zealand, formerly known as the New Zealand Softball Association, is the governing body for the sport of softball in New Zealand. Softball New Zealand consists of a number of regional associations and local clubs.

History
On 11 January 1938, it was founded as New Zealand Softball Association. New Zealand's first national men’s inter-provincial tournament took place on 25 March 1939 at the Winter Show Grounds in Wellington.

New Zealand first competed on the international stage when Australia women's teams toured New Zealand in 1949. The International Softball Federation (ISF) (now World Baseball Softball Confederation) hosted the first women's world championships in Melbourne, Australia in 1965. New Zealand finished fourth in a field of 5. The women's team won their first world title in 1982.

The first men's world championships took place in 1966 in Mexico City, Mexico where New Zealand finished third. The men have gone on to become the most successful team winning the world championships 7 times.

New Zealand softball have had 27 players, 7 coaches, 3 umpires 5 administrators, inducted into the WBSC Softball Hall of Fame along with 5 others for their meritorious service.

Member associations
To date there are 23 member associations as listed on Softball New Zealand's website:

Auckland Softball Association
Bay of Islands Softball
Central Otago Softball Association
Canterbury Softball Association
Counties Softball
Eastern Southland Softball Association
Franklin Softball Association
Hawkes Bay Softball
Hutt Valley Softball Association
Manawatu Softball
Marlborough Softball Association
Mid Canterbury Softball
Nelson Softball Association
North Harbour Softball
Army
Otago Softball Association
South Canterbury Softball Association
Southland Softball Association
Tairawhiti Softball Association
Waikato Softball Association
Whanganui Softball Association
Wellington Softball Association
Western Bay of Plenty Softball Association

Competitions
National Fastpitch Championships (men & women)
Open Club Championships (men & women)
U-23 National Tournament (youth men & women)

Defunct competitions
NZCT National League (men & women) (2002–2008)

Current title holders

See also
Men's
 New Zealand men's national softball team
 New Zealand men's national under-23 softball team
 New Zealand men's junior national softball team

Women's
 New Zealand women's national softball team
 New Zealand women's national under-18 softball team

References

External links
 New Zealand Softball - official website

Softball in New Zealand
Softball
Sports organizations established in 1938
1938 establishments in New Zealand